Miracle Theatre, sometimes known by the Spanish translation of its name Teatro Milagro, is the only Hispanic theater production company in the Pacific Northwest. Its home is in Portland, Oregon, United States, though it often tours regionally and nationally. It was founded in 1985.

The theater operates through three arms: the Miracle Mainstage, with English language productions at the company's theater in southeast Portland, and Teatro Milagro, the international touring company, with bilingual English/Spanish productions, and Bellas Artes, a multidisciplinary company that stages community-based events, such as annual Dia de Los Muertos, Las Posadas festivals, and educational programs.

The Miracle Theatre generally produces about a half-dozen productions of original and revival plays annually, along with related programs.

History 
Teatro Milagro was founded in the year 1985 by José Eduardo González and Dañel Malán, who would become the Executive and Artistic Director, respectively. Teatro Milagro produced and featured Oedipus Rex as its first. Miracle Theatre continued to produce Greek tragedies and comedies for the next seven years. Apart from Greek Classic plays, Milagro also produced plays such as Roosters by Milcha Sanchez-Scott. Milagro's touring and educational projects began in 1989 with Pérez y Martina, a play adapted from a Puerto Rican/Mexican folktale. Up until 1992 Teatro Milagro presented both Hispanic plays, which were shown in the spring, and Greek plays, which were shown in the fall. However, in 1992 the theater fully dedicated themselves to creating and producing Hispanic works. Following 1992, Teatro Milagro has performed a variety of plays per year, alongside organizing the Hispanic Cultural Festival. This was up until the 8th annual and last festival occurred during 1995–1996.

Over the 2018–2019 season, Milagro had over 5,000 audience members in attendance performed over 85 times, and whilst they were on tour, Milagro held over 80 workshops, residencies, and performances in Oregon and 8 other states, reaching over 11,700 students in K–12 schools and colleges.

Foundation 
Originally The Miracle Theatre was located at the Northwest Service Center where it stayed until the end of 1992. Milagro had reached another important juncture, it decided to relinquish tenancy of the Northwest Service Center in favor of finding its own home, Over the next three years Milagro continued to produce a full season of productions utilizing other spaces throughout the region.

Finally after three years, in 1995 Teatro Milagro found a place to stay in Portland, Oregon Milagro leased this space in the Central Eastside Industrial District in which it built a 120-seat theater and finally established itself a home as the Miracle Mainstage. They were able to set this up in just seven weeks, until eventually its opening with the Día de los Muertos Festival. Eventually in December 1997, Milagro officially purchased the building and founded El Centro Milagro, Portland's first Latino cultural center, which allowed for expansion and independence.

Work in the Community 
Teatro Milagro offers many different opportunities to engage with the community around them. Not only do they advance the knowledge of Latinx culture, but there are also many different community outreach programs and internship opportunities that they are involved in.

One of Milagros most recent projects was the Oregon Latino Oral History Project in which they worked alongside the NWFILM Center to depict the evolution of Oregon's Latino population. The Project began in 2017, inspired by an earlier initiative Heroes Magnificos in which they expanded on opportunities for underrepresented communities to have the opportunity to watch, learn, and make film.

They also host many different community events which include

 ¿ Qué Pasa Venezuela?
 Wolf at the Door: Fairy tales, morality stories, and mythology
 An Evening of Latinx Literature

Teatro Milagro 
In 1989, Miracle Theater created Teatro Milagro, a bilingual tour program for performing arts. It was co-founded by Executive and artistic director, Jose Gonzalez and Dañel Malang, respectively. Milagro's mission is "to provide an outstanding Latin theater, cultural and arts education experience to enrich all communities

The program takes national tours to partner with schools and universities to perform original bilingual works, and provide education and training in underserved areas. Student tickets to Milagro shows are often released for free or at a low cost. Theater and workshops cover a wide range of topics, including socio-economic disparities, racism, ecological and health inequality, and loss of cultural identity. Milagro is working with schools and social services agencies to raise awareness and address the key issues facing the Latin community.
	
The Teatro Milagro curriculum, known as UNIDAD, teaches self-esteem in addition to community well-being through theatrical expression. The curriculum can be presented in through several academic subjects. Teatro Milagro partners with Opciones y Educación (OYE), to promote conversations in the Latino community, with a focus on healthier relationships and sexual health.

Archives 
	Miracle Theater collaborated with The Oregon Multicultural Archives (OMA) for the purpose of preserving records integral to the history of the theater. Milagro's full archived record consisted of 27 cubic feet of material documenting theater management and board, architectural history, public and educational efforts, staff and artists, finances, and creative programs. In addition to textual documents, the collection includes photographic and audiovisual medias and materials.
	To make the records accessible to the public, OMA copied and condensed Milagro's records to be presented alongside those of the Obo Addy Legacy Project, a West African dance and music group, also established in Portland, Oregon. The organizations were chosen to be archived together due to their same purpose of providing voices and representation of their respective cultural groups. The exhibit included viewing stations so visitors could watch performance clips. The exhibit was on view from April to September 2014.

See also
 Hispanics and Latinos in Portland, Oregon

External links
 Miracle Theatre (official website)

References

1985 establishments in Oregon
Culture of Portland, Oregon
Hispanic and Latino American culture in Portland, Oregon
Theatre companies in Oregon